Robert McFarland (9 July 1847 – 4 July 1876) was an Australian cricketer. He played one first-class cricket match for Victoria in 1871.

See also
 List of Victoria first-class cricketers

References

1847 births
1876 deaths
Australian cricketers
Victoria cricketers
Cricketers from Victoria (Australia)
People from Coleraine, Victoria